Minnett is a surname. Notable people with the surname include:

Harry Clive Minnett (1917–2003), Australian astronomer
Leslie Minnett (1883–1934), Australian cricketer
Roy Minnett (1888–1955), Australian cricketer, brother of Leslie and Rupert
Rupert Minnett (1884–1974), Australian cricketer